Genaro Antonio Sermeño Quijada (28 November 1948 – 23 December 2022) was an El Salvadoran footballer who represented his country at the 1970 FIFA World Cup.

Club career
Sermeño played eight years for FAS in which he scored 29 goals.

International career
Nicknamed el Kaizer, Sermeño played 14 minutes for the El Salvador national team during the 1970 FIFA World Cup.

Managerial career
In 1999, Sermeño was technical director of Juventud Olímpica.

Death
On 23 December 2022, Sermeño died from complications from diabetes, at a private hospital in Santa Ana, El Salvador. He was 74.

References

External links
 La historia de la clasificacion a la Copa Mundo 1970 - ElBalónCuscatleco 

1948 births
2022 deaths
People from Santa Ana Department
Salvadoran footballers
Association football midfielders
El Salvador international footballers
1970 FIFA World Cup players
C.D. FAS footballers
C.D. Sonsonate footballers